Hans Mayer (19 March 1907 in Cologne – 19 May 2001 in Tübingen; pseudonym: Martin Seiler) was a German literary scholar. Mayer was also a jurist and social researcher and was internationally recognized as a critic, author and musicologist.

Life 
Hans Mayer was born in an upper-class Jewish family. He was influenced in his youth by the writings of Georg Lukács and Karl Marx. He was a socialist.

He studied jurisprudence, political science, history and philosophy in Cologne, Bonn and Berlin and received his doctorate in 1930 with a thesis titled "Die Krise der deutschen Staatslehre" (The Crisis of German Political Science). At the same time, he joined the SPD and worked on the magazine Der Rote Kämpfer (The Red Fighter). In 1931, he moved to the SAPD, which expelled him again one year later because of his sympathy for the KPD-O. Since he was a Jew and a Marxist and therefore banned from his profession in July 1933, he fled in August 1933 to France, where he worked for a short time as the chief editor of the Die Neue Welt ('The New World'), which was the daily newspaper of the Alsatian KPO. In 1934, Hans Mayer had to flee to Geneva. Here, he received jobs from Hans Kelsen and Max Horkheimer as a social researcher. He left the KPD-O in 1935. Carl Jacob Burckhardt influenced his literary orientation during this time.

From 1937 to 1939, Mayer was a member of the Collège de Sociologie, founded by Georges Bataille, Michel Leiris and Roger Caillois in 1937. There he held a lecture about the secret political societies in German Romanticism and demonstrated how these secret societies already anticipated Nazi symbolism. Other exiles at the Collège were Walter Benjamin and Paul L. Landsberg.

After the end of the war, he returned to Germany in 1945. The Americans made him the cultural editor of the German news agency, DENA, the predecessor of the DPA, and later the chief political editor of Radio Frankfurt.

In 1948, he and his friend Stephan Hermlin, went to the Soviet occupation zone. In Leipzig he accepted a professorship for literary studies and became an influential critic of the new German literature. It was possible for him to cross between the East German and the West German world. In the East, he worked through his lectures and discussion circles, and in West Germany he was a welcome guest at meetings of Group 47. He was also in contact with Bertolt Brecht during this time.

His relationship with those in power in the GDR was characterized by more friction as of 1956. He resigned in 1963 and did not return to the GDR after a visit to a publisher in Tübingen. In 1965, he was appointed to a newly created chair for German literature at the University of Hannover. He held this chair until his retirement in 1973. After that, he lived in Tübingen as an honorary professor. As he grew older, he lost his eyesight, but he was still able to dictate his texts. For that reason, his publications extend well into his old age.

Work 
The work of Hans Mayer includes more than forty volumes. He studied Büchner, Thomas Mann, Montaigne, Robert Musil, James Joyce, Uwe Johnson, Günter Grass, Hans Henny Jahnn and others in his investigations on the history of literature.

While he was in exile in 1936, he began the advance work for his great work about Georg Büchner. This work about Büchner was later recognized by the University of Leipzig as his postdoctoral thesis which was required to qualify as a professor.

He released the collection of essays, Zur deutschen Literatur der Zeit, in 1962. In 1986, he followed this volume with the book, Das unglückliche Bewusstsein – Zur deutschen Literaturgeschichte von Lessing bis Heine. Ein Deutscher auf Widerruf is the title of his three-volume memoires of 1982.

The investigation, Außenseiter, which appeared in 1975, was considered by many to be his main work. In this volume, he deals with the literary portrayal of three groups, which have commonly been discriminated against in history: women, male homosexuals and Jews. He had his own experiences with belonging to two of these groups – as a Jew and as a homosexual.

Der Turm von Babel of 1991 is an obituary on the GDR. Its key sentence is frequently seen to be: "Das schlechte Ende widerlegt nicht einen möglicherweise guten Anfang" – "The bad end doesn't disprove a possibly good beginning." The GDR was the better of the two German states to him for a long time.

The last book published by Mayer is Erinnerungen an Willy Brandt from 2001.

Tributes and criticism 

When it comes to acknowledging the work on Hans Mayer, these points are especially emphasized:

In the middle of Stalinism, he defended authors such as Kafka, Proust, James Joyce and Ernst Bloch.
In his lectures, it was important to him to investigate literature time after time with a view to whether it was suitable to promote humanity.
His special attention for the non-compliant and Außenseiter (outsider) especially stands out.
Mayer was an important supporter for many young authors (for example, for Uwe Johnson).

Hans Mayer was an honorary citizen of the city of Leipzig, had honorary doctorates from universities in Brussels, Wisconsin and Leipzig, was an honorary professor in Peking, was winner of the National Prize of East Germany, as well as the Bundesverdienstkreuz (Federal Cross of Merit) of the class "Großes Verdienstkreuz mit Stern und Schulterband" (Great Cross of Merit with Star and shoulder ribbon). He was honored with the Ernst-Bloch Prize in 1988. He was a member of the Akademie der Künste (Academy of the Arts) in Berlin and an honorary member of the
Sächsische Akademie der Künste (Saxon Academy of the Arts).

Hans Mayer, along with Walter Benjamin, who was also with him at the Collège de Sociologie, and some others, belongs to the most important literary critics of the 20th century. Perhaps there is some correlation to a former competitive situation, which Marcel Reich-Ranicki wrote about in an obituary, which shows Mayer's life in an unflattering light. Reich-Ranicki describes the story of Hans Mayer's life as a tragic story, as the story of a person who did not find a home anywhere.

Selected literary works 
 Karl Marx und das Elend des Geistes. Studien zur neuen deutschen Ideologie. Westkulturverlag Anton Hain, Meisenheim am Glan 1948.
 Richard Wagner, 1959
 Zur deutschen Literatur der Zeit, 1962
 Georg Büchner und seine Zeit, 1972
 Außenseiter, 1975
 Ein Deutscher auf Widerruf, 1982
 Wir Außenseiter, 1983
Widersprüche einer europäischen Literatur, 1984
 Das unglückliche Bewusstsein – Zur deutschen Literaturgeschichte von Lessing bis Heine, 1986
 Der Turm von Babel, 1991
 Versuch über Hans Henny Jahnn, 1994
 Erinnerungen an Willy Brandt, 2001
 Briefe 1948–1963. Publ. and annotated by Mark Lehmstedt, Leipzig 2006

References 

All references are in German

 Volker Ladenthin: Hans Mayer und das "Unglückliche Bewußtsein". In: Volker Ladenthin: Moderne Literatur und Bildung. Hildesheim-New York 1991. pp. 136–162
 Clemens Berger: Der späte Hans Mayer. Aspekte im Lebens-Werk eines Außenseiters, 2003 (dissertation, Vienna)
 Stephan Moebius: DIE ZAUBERLEHRLINGE. Soziologiegeschichte des COLLÈGE DE SOCIOLOGIE 1937-1939 (Georges Bataille, Michel Leiris, Roger Caillois, die Geheimgesellschaft 'Acéphale' und die Wirkungen auf Foucault, Lévinas, Nancy, Maffesoli, Baudrillard und Derrida). 552 pages, Constance: UVK, 2006,

External links 

Obituary for Hans Mayer
 Recordings with Hans Mayer in the Online Archive of the Österreichische Mediathek (Interviews in German). Retrieved 2 September 2019

1907 births
2001 deaths
Writers from Cologne
Jewish emigrants from Nazi Germany to Switzerland
Jurists from Cologne
German literary critics
German Marxists
Jewish socialists
Social Democratic Party of Germany politicians
Socialist Workers' Party of Germany politicians
Communist Party of Germany (Opposition) politicians
People from the Rhine Province
University of Cologne alumni
University of Bonn alumni
Humboldt University of Berlin alumni
Academic staff of Leipzig University
Academic staff of the University of Hanover
Academic staff of the University of Tübingen
Heinrich Mann Prize winners
German gay writers
German essayists
Grand Crosses with Star and Sash of the Order of Merit of the Federal Republic of Germany
Members of the Academy of Arts, Berlin
German male essayists
20th-century essayists
Gay academics